The Baltic Cup 2008 football competition took place from 30 May to 1 June 2008 at the Slokas Stadium in Jūrmala and at the Skonto Stadium in Riga, Latvia.

Hosts Latvia together with Lithuania and Estonia are the teams that took part.

Results

Winners

Statistics

Goalscorers

Under-21 results

Statistics

Goalscorers

See also
 Balkan Cup
 Nordic Football Championship

References

External links
 RSSSF: Baltic Cup 2008 overview
 2008 Baltic Cup at Latvian Football Federation

Baltic Cup (football)
Baltic Cup
Baltic Cup
Baltic Cup
International association football competitions hosted by Latvia